Bear Creek is a stream in Olmsted County, in the U.S. state of Minnesota. It is a tributary of the Zumbro River.

Bear Creek was named after Benjamin Bear, a pioneer settler.

See also
List of rivers of Minnesota

References

Rivers of Olmsted County, Minnesota
Rivers of Minnesota